Nicholas Selson Gioacchini (born July 25, 2000) is an American professional soccer player who plays as a forward or winger for Major League Soccer club St. Louis City SC.

Early life and youth soccer
Gioacchini was born in Kansas City, Missouri, to an Italian father and Jamaican mother. He played for Blue Valley Soccer Club when he was young, and for the Orange Stars coached by Jay Burgess. He moved to Parma, Italy at the age of 8. He returned to the United States at the age of 12 where his family settled in Bethesda, Maryland, where he played for Bethesda Soccer Club, Cerritos Soccer Academy, D.C. United Academy, Olney Soccer Club and ESSA Soccer Academy.

Club career
At the age of 15, Gioacchini moved with his family to France. He joined Paris FC in 2015.

On May 14, 2018, Gioacchini signed a two-year contract with Caen. He made his debut for Caen in a 4–2 Ligue 2 win over his former club Paris FC on October 25, 2019, scoring his side's first goal in the 25th minute. He scored another goal against Nancy on December 2, 2019.

On July 20, 2022, it was announced Gioacchini had signed a two-and-a-half year contract plus option year with Orlando City of Major League Soccer.

On November 11, 2022, Gioacchini was selected by St. Louis City in the 2022 MLS Expansion Draft ahead of their inaugural season in MLS.

International career
Before being cap-tied to the United States, Gioacchini was also eligible to play for Italy and Jamaica. He received his first call up to the senior United States squad for matches against Wales and Panama in November 2020. Gioacchini made his debut for the senior team as a late substitute against Wales on November 12, 2020. He started the following match against Panama on November 16, scoring two goals in a 6–2 friendly victory.

He was named to the United States roster for the 2021 CONCACAF Gold Cup.

Career statistics

Club

International 

Scores and results list United States' goal tally first, score column indicates score after each Gioacchini goal.

Honors
Orlando City
U.S. Open Cup: 2022

United States
CONCACAF Gold Cup: 2021

References

External links
 
 SM Caen Profile
 
 

2000 births
Living people
Soccer players from Kansas City, Missouri
Association football forwards
Association football wingers
American soccer players
United States men's international soccer players
American people of Italian descent
American sportspeople of Jamaican descent
African-American soccer players
Montpellier HSC players
Stade Malherbe Caen players
Orlando City SC players
Orlando City B players
Ligue 1 players
Ligue 2 players
Championnat National 2 players
Championnat National 3 players
American expatriate soccer players
2021 CONCACAF Gold Cup players
Expatriate footballers in France
American expatriate sportspeople in France
CONCACAF Gold Cup-winning players
21st-century African-American sportspeople
20th-century African-American sportspeople
MLS Next Pro players
Major League Soccer players